Mary Babirye Kabanda (born 23 November 1971) is  a Ugandan politician, and  teacher. She was born in Masaka and is currently a member of the 10th parliament as the Masaka district MP. Mary Babirye Kabanda is married.

Background and education 
In her early life, Kabanda went to St Joseph Bikira Girls school in 1985 for her Primary Living Exams, St Edward SS Bukuumi for her Uganda Certificate of Education in 1989, St  Aloysius SS Bwanda for her Uganda Advanced Certificate of Education in 1992, Makerere University for her bachelor's degree in Economics in 1995, postgraduate Degree in Education 1996 and Uganda Martyrs University for her Advanced Diploma in Advanced Education Management in 2001, Bachelor's degree in Microfinance and Community Development in 2010 and Master's degree in Arts in Local Governance and Human Rights in 2016

Career 
Kabanda is a teacher by profession,  was a Head teacher at St Joseph SS Kigando, Kilboga from 1995–1998, St Peters SS Busubizi Mityana from 1998–2000, Blessed sacrament SS Kimanya Masaka from 2000–2013, a Director at St Jude SS Masaka 2013 to date and currently a member of Parliament  in the Parliament of Uganda 2016 to date.

References

Living people
Members of the Parliament of Uganda
1971 births
Women members of the Parliament of Uganda
21st-century Ugandan politicians
21st-century Ugandan women politicians